Anthony Abell College, formerly Government English School, is a government secondary school in Seria, a town in Belait District, Brunei. It was one of the earliest secondary schools to be established in the country. The school provides five years of general secondary education leading up to O Level qualification. It has 630 students. The current principal is Mas Diana binti Haji Abdul Samat.

Namesake 
Anthony Abell College is named after His Excellency Sir Anthony Foster Abell, who was a former British colonial official and Governor of Sarawak and the British High Commissioner in Brunei.

History

The early education began in 1952. Anthony Abell College founded in December 1952 and was known as the Government English School. The first building was only a scout hut located in Jalan Sultan, Kuala Belait. This building housed 22 students and one teacher who was also the principal, Mr. D.S. Carter. 

In January 1953, the Government English School moved to Seria Town at the current Post Office site with a building of 2 classrooms. In January 1954, the school had its own building located between Jalan Tengah and Lorong 2 Seria accommodating 57 students.

In 1958, the School moved to the present building at Jalan Sultan Omar Ali, Seria. The college was officially opened on 18 December 1958 after Sir Anthony Abell himself officiated the opening.

In 2002, the college celebrated its Golden Jubilee Anniversary.

Academics
The College provides secondary education from Year 7, aged 11–12 years old to Year 11, aged 15–16 years old. In National Education System for the 21st Century/ Sistem Pendidikan Negara Abad 21 (SPN21), generally students will study 5 years, from Year 7 to Year 11 or Express route for 4 years of study i.e. Year 7 to Year 10.

All students will follow common curriculum at Year 7 and Year 8. After Year 8, students will be channeled to one of the following:
1. General Secondary Education Programme ( Year 9 to Year 10 or Year 9 to Year 11)
2. Applied Secondary Education Programme ( Year 9 to Year 11) 
3. Special Applied Programme (Year 9 to Year 11)

Students will complete the general schooling system or proceed to vocational and technical institutions only after completing Year 10 (4-Year General Secondary Education Programme) or Year 11 ( 5-Year Secondary Education Programme) before sitting for BC GCE 'O' Level, IGCSE, BTEC or other alternative qualification.

In Special Applied Programme, the College offered only 2 BTEC courses i.e. Pearson BTEC Hospitality and Pearson BTEC IT Users (ITQ) at up to Level 2.
 
The college also offered Specialised Education Programme which caters for students who are in the following need categories: 
1. visually and auditory impaired
2. physically challenged
3. specific learning challenges

Notable alumni 

 Sulaiman Damit, commander of the Royal Brunei Armed Forces and diplomat.
 Abdul Aziz Abu Bakar, spouse of Princess Masna Bolkiah.

See also 
 List of secondary schools in Brunei

References

"Ministry of Education, Brunei Darussalam". moe.gov.bn. Retrieved 2018-04-18.IGCSE examination.

1955-, Asbol bin Haji Mail, Haji Awang (2010). Sejarah perkembangan pendidikan di Brunei, 1950-1985 (Cet. 2 ed.). Bandar Seri Begawan: Pusat Sejarah Brunei, Kementerian Kebudayaan, Belia dan Sukan. p. 56. . OCLC 642642811.

Secondary schools in Brunei
Cambridge schools in Brunei
Educational institutions established in 1952
1952 establishments in Brunei